Diane Douglas is an American politician who served as Arizona Superintendent of Public Instruction from 2015 to 2019. She was elected on November 4, 2014, edging out her Democratic opponent, David Garcia, by one percentage point.

Douglas succeeded John Huppenthal, whom she defeated for the party's nomination in the Republican primary on August 26, 2014. Immediately after her election, Douglas faced a recall effort by voters who claimed that she was not qualified for the position.

Early career and education
Born in Plainfield, New Jersey, Douglas earned an Associate degree in business from Somerset County College and a Bachelor of Arts in business and marketing from Rutgers University.

Career 
Prior to serving as Superintendent of Public Instruction, Douglas worked in accounting and financial analysis for several firms. She has also spoken at conferences sponsored by AZ Right to Life and Americans for Prosperity.

Douglas was the subject of a recall effort while serving on the Peoria Unified School District board in 2010 due to a conflict of interest. Douglas was also serving as the treasurer of the axthetax.com coalition, which was opposed to a temporary one cent Arizona sales tax to fund education. Douglas lost to Gary Sherwood in 2012 for the Sahuaro District of the Glendale, Arizona City Council by 330 votes.

Superintendent of Public Instruction
Douglas was elected as the Arizona Superintendent of Public Instruction in 2014. She was subsequently sworn into office on January 5, 2015, succeeding John Huppenthal, who lost in the Republican primary on August 26, 2014.

In her first year in office, a recall effort failed to gather enough signatures to make the ballot. However, as of August 2016, Douglas's approval rating was just 16 percent. In the 2018 elections, Douglas lost her re-election bid in the Republican party primary despite being the incumbent, finishing third in a closely contested race in which the top four candidates all received approximately 20% to 22% of the vote. She was eventually succeeded by Democrat Kathy Hoffman.

Electoral history

References

External links
 Official website, Superintendent of Public Instruction

Arizona Republicans
Educators from New Jersey
American women educators
Living people
Politicians from Plainfield, New Jersey
Rutgers University alumni
School board members in Arizona
Superintendents of Public Instruction of Arizona
Women in Arizona politics
Women state constitutional officers of Arizona
Year of birth missing (living people)
21st-century American women